Donald Joseph Klang (born January 23, 1985) is an American singer. He won Making the Band 4 and was awarded his own solo contract by Diddy. He released his debut album, Just a Rolling Stone, in late 2008.

Life and career 
Klang was born in Brooklyn, New York. He began modeling as a baby and doing television and film work from a young age, getting minor roles on NYPD Blue to The Nanny. He was in a band in middle school, later attending chorus in high school. He was part of pop groups in St. Dominic High School and Island Trees High School, namely Playa Deception and INT. The latter which released an independent record called Hip-Pop. He attended Hofstra University briefly studying music management and business and minoring in music. Klang decided to take a semester off of college to pursue a music career with his group.

Klang had been in INT for nine years before it broke up because their parents wanted them to go back to school as the band was going nowhere. He auditioned for American Idol twice but never got past the first round. These events led to him being apprehensive of pursuing music further. Not long after returning to Hofstra and working at a warehouse, the opportunity came for Making the Band 4 and he again took time off from college in 2007. An acquaintance had entered his MySpace account into an audition which he later attended at the encouragement of his family. He was awarded his own solo contract by Diddy instead of a spot in the group. Klang released his debut album, Just a Rolling Stone, in late 2008 which peaked at number nineteen on the Billboard 200. He later opened for Janet Jackson in the fall.

Klang split with Bad Boy Records in mid-2010, signing with independent label Eight72 Entertainment. He began working on his second album at the same time. He later started his own record label, Donnie Klang Entertainment and released his first single "Falling 4U" in 2011. He also released a mixtape on Valentine's Day. "X-Miss" was also released as a single for Christmas in 2011.

Artistry 
Klang has listed Boyz II Men, Dru Hill, NSYNC, Backstreet Boys, Usher, The Fray, OneRepublic,  Justin Timberlake, Brian McKnight, Michael Jackson and James Brown as musical influences. He co-wrote most of Just a Rolling Stone.

Discography

Studio albums

Singles

Music videos

References

External links 

incumbent

1985 births
American male dancers
American male pop singers
American contemporary R&B singers
Atlantic Records artists
Bad Boy Records artists
Living people
Musicians from Brooklyn
Singers from New York City
21st-century American singers
21st-century American male singers